Chicago Heights (alternate title: The Last Soul on a Summer Night) is a 2009 film written and directed by Daniel Nearing. This experimental, non-linear film is an ambitious adaptation of Sherwood Anderson’s short story cycle, Winesburg, Ohio. Noted film critic Roger Ebert included Chicago Heights in his list of the Top Art Films of 2010.

Plot 

Chicago Heights is set in the mind of an old writer (William Gray) as lies on his bed. Sensing his death is imminent, his mind drifts, and he remembers people, but can't discern if they are part of his dreams, his memories, or his inventions.

The reflections relate to the elderly man’s coming of age (Nathan Walker is played as younger by Andre Truss) and his relationship with his mother (Keisha Dyson). He also sees into the lives of others he might have known, like a Chicago Heights church pastor (Gerrold Johnson), a professor (Michaele Nicole), and a psychologist (Benny Stewart) who worked with his mother.

Cast 

Andre Truss - Nathan Walker
Keisha Dyson - Elizabeth Walker 
Benny Stewart - Narrator / Doctor Reefy 
Jay Johnson - Reverend Curtis Hartman 
William Gray - Sherwood Anderson / Older Nathan 
Ron Jarmon, Jr. - Wash Williams 
Simone Wilson - Louise Trunnion 
Terah Jene  - Helen White 
Michaele Nicole - Kate Swift 
James Barbee - Dante Hard 
Raven Reeves - Calla Hard 
Jason Coleman - The Stranger 
Brian Harris - Tom Walker 
Tovah Hicks - Margot Williams 
Barbara Hogu - Mrs. Swift 
Homer Talbert - Elizabeth’s Father 
Sherri Evans - Mrs. Hartman 
Mercedes Kane - Actress / Snow Angel 
Leah Shortell - Patient / Snow Angel 
Lynn Werth - Margot’s Mother 
Lisa Klein - Dead Elizabeth
Linsey Savage - Man in Snowstorm 
Victor Collazo - Man in Forest Under the Church 
Finnegan Klein-Nearing - Depression

Adaptation 
Because Winesburg, Ohio is a collection of inter-related stories and not a linear novel,
many critics thought it could never be made into a film. Nearing and writing partner Rudy Thauberger began adapting the book more than a decade before the film was made.

The pair struggled to find a way to adapt the book to fit the conventional three-act film script structure. When it became clear that a straight adaptation wouldn’t work, Nearing decided to draw a line through the book’s key stories by consolidating some characters and taking some carefully considered liberties with the overall story.  One of the biggest changes was moving the period story from rural Ohio to a present-day urban setting. Those modifications allowed Nearing to capture the essence of Sherwood Anderson’s sprawling book in a feature-length film.

Production 
Chicago Heights was produced in numerous Illinois communities and cities: Chicago Heights, Lockport, Evanston, University Park, and Chicago.

Music 
Chicago Heights music was composed by Minister Raymond Dunlap. Lyrics to "Nobody Knows" and numerous other songs are written by Daniel Nearing and Sherwood Anderson.

Recognition and honors 
Recognition and Awards
*Best Art Films of 2010 - Roger Ebert
In Competition - Flash Forward - Busan International Film Festival 
Best Film in a Fine Arts Discipline - Berlin Black Film Festival
Official Selection - Black Harvest Film Festival, Gene Siskel Film Center
Official Selection - Ohio Independent Film Festival
Short Film Corner (as "Nobody Knows), Festival de Cannes
Honorable Mention, Narrative Category - Columbus International Film Festival

References 

2009 films
2000s avant-garde and experimental films
American nonlinear narrative films
American avant-garde and experimental films
2000s English-language films
2000s American films